was a town located in Uto District, Kumamoto Prefecture, Japan.

As of 2003, the town had an estimated population of 9,656 and the density of 334.93 persons per km². The total area was 28.83 km².

On January 15, 2005, Shiranuhi, along with the town of Misumi (also from Uto District), and the towns of Matsubase, Ogawa and Toyono (all from Shimomashiki District), was merged to create the city of Uki and no longer exists as an independent municipality.

External links
 Official website of Uki 

Dissolved municipalities of Kumamoto Prefecture